The  was a  howitzer used by the Imperial Japanese Army during the Second Sino-Japanese War and World War II. The Type 91 number was designated for the year the gun was accepted, 2591 in the Japanese imperial year calendar, or 1931 in the Gregorian calendar.

History and development

The Type 91 10 cm howitzer was an orthodox design howitzer, based largely on contemporary French Canon de 105 mle 1913 Schneider howitzers ordered during the late 1920s by the Japanese Army Technical Bureau for evaluation purposes. It was intended to supplement, and eventually supersede the largely obsolete Type 38 15 cm howitzer, which had been in service since the end of the Russo-Japanese War.  Over one thousand units were produced beginning in 1931.

Design

For a weapon of modern design the Model 91 (1931) 105 mm howitzer is by U. S. standards an extremely crude-looking piece. It is much smaller and lighter than the German and U. S. howitzers of the same caliber, weighing even less than the standard  guns used in Europe in World War I. Despite its lightness and its appearance of not having been quite finished, it is capable of throwing a  shell very nearly as far as can the heavier and far more formidable looking German 105 mm howitzer.

The Type 91 10 cm howitzer  was a standard 105 mm artillery piece of extremely light construction relative to range and weight of projector. It can be identified by its demountable spade plates, long cradle extending almost to muzzle end of tube, a hydro-pneumatic recoil mechanism, Split trail, and interrupted screw breech mechanism. It was designed to be towed by a team of six horses.

Japanese charge-system numbering is
unusual, in that the numbering is reversed from American, British, German, French and Italian charge numbering systems:
 Charge 1: 
 Charge 2: 
 Charge 3: 
 Charge 4:

Variants

Early models of the Type 91 had wooden spoked wheels, but later versions had steel wheels with pneumatic tires for towing behind a motorized transport at the cost of an extra .

Combat record
Type 91 10 cm howitzer was used in large numbers in front line combat service from the time of the invasion of Manchuria through the Soviet-Japanese Border Wars, the Second Sino-Japanese War and in most fronts during the Pacific War. The Type 91 was typically assigned to field artillery regiments together with 75 mm field guns.

Weapons captured by the Chinese during the Second Sino-Japanese War, or abandoned in China at the time of the surrender of Japan, were placed into service by both the Nationalist government and the Communist forces during the Chinese Civil War.

References

Notes

Bibliography
 Bishop, Chris (eds) The Encyclopedia of Weapons of World War II. Barnes & Nobel. 1998. 
 Chamberlain, Peter and Gander, Terry. Light and Medium Field Artillery. Macdonald and Jane's (1975). 
 Chant, Chris. Artillery of World War II, Zenith Press, 2001, 
 McLean, Donald B. Japanese Artillery; Weapons and Tactics. Wickenburg, Ariz.: Normount Technical Publications 1973. .
 Mayer, S.L. The Rise and Fall of Imperial Japan. The Military Press (1984) 
War Department Special Series No 25 Japanese Field Artillery October 1944
 US Department of War, TM 30-480, Handbook on Japanese Military Forces, Louisiana State University Press, 1994.

External links
 Type 91 on Taki's Imperial Japanese Army page
 US Technical Manual E 30-480

World War II field artillery
9
105 mm artillery
Military equipment introduced in the 1930s